Llumpa District is one of eight districts of the Mariscal Luzuriaga Province in Peru. This district was created by Law, dated at October 28, 1889, president of Perou: Andrés A. Cáceres

Ethnic groups 
The people in the district are mainly indigenous citizens of Quechua descent. Quechua is the language which the majority of the population (95.92%) learnt to speak in childhood, 3.12% of the residents started speaking using the Spanish language (2007 Peru Census).

See also 
 Ancash Quechua

See also 
 Pukarahu

References

Districts of the Mariscal Luzuriaga Province
Districts of the Ancash Region